Mordellistena dybasi is a beetle in the genus Mordellistena of the family Mordellidae. It was described in 1948 by Ray.

References

dybasi
Beetles described in 1948